Sandi Ogrinec (born 5 June 1998) is a Slovenian professional footballer who plays as a midfielder for Austrian Bundesliga club WSG Tirol.

Club career

Ogrinec made his professional debut in Slovenian PrvaLiga for Maribor on 21 May 2016 in a game against Gorica.

Notes

References

External links
 NZS profile 
 

1998 births
Living people
Slovenian footballers
Association football midfielders
NK Maribor players
NK Krško players
NK Bravo players
WSG Tirol players
Slovenian PrvaLiga players
Austrian Football Bundesliga players
Slovenian expatriate footballers
Slovenian expatriate sportspeople in Austria
Expatriate footballers in Austria
Slovenia youth international footballers
Slovenia under-21 international footballers